is a railway station on the Sasshō Line in Kita-ku, Sapporo, Hokkaido, Japan, operated by the Hokkaido Railway Company (JR Hokkaido). The station is numbered G09.

Lines

Station layout
The station has two side platforms serving two tracks. The station has automated ticket machines and Kitaca card readers. and a "Midori no Madoguchi" staffed ticket office.

Platforms

History
The station opened on 15 December 1967.

References

External links

 Station accessibility information 

Railway stations in Sapporo
Railway stations in Japan opened in 1967
Stations of Hokkaido Railway Company
Kita-ku, Sapporo